InsideAR was the largest augmented reality event in Europe. It was organized and supported by metaio GmbH every year. The first event was held in 2010, had since expanded globally and was run at multiple locations around the world.  However, after Apple purchased metaio in May 2015, metaio cancelled the InsideAR conference 2015 without any statements about the conference's future.

References 

Augmented reality